The Stade Henri-Lux is an athletics stadium in Saint-Étienne, France. It has a running track of eight lanes and holds 2,700 spectators.

Various national and international competitions have been held in the stadium:
 World Games Handisports   
 Jeux UNSS 2000   
 France Championships in Athletics: 2001, 2002

Notes

Athletics (track and field) venues in France
Sport in Saint-Étienne
Sports venues in Loire (department)